This page covers all the important events in the sport of tennis in 2013. Primarily, it provides the results of notable tournaments throughout the year on both the ATP and WTA Tours, the Davis Cup, and the Fed Cup.

ATP World Tour

The 2013 ATP World Tour was the global elite professional tennis circuit organized by the Association of Tennis Professionals (ATP) for the 2013 tennis season. The 2013 ATP World Tour calendar comprises the Grand Slam tournaments (supervised by the International Tennis Federation (ITF)), the ATP World Tour Masters 1000, the ATP World Tour 500 series, the ATP World Tour 250 series, the Davis Cup (organized by the ITF) and the ATP World Tour Finals. Also included in the 2013 calendar is the Hopman Cup, which was organized by the ITF.

ATP World Tour Masters 1000 

The ATP World Tour Masters 1000 was a series of 9 tennis tournaments that are part of the Association of Tennis Professionals (ATP) tour, held annually throughout the year in Europe, North America and Asia. The series constituted the most prestigious tournaments in men's tennis after the four Grand Slam events and the ATP World Tour Finals.

ATP Challenger Tour

The Association of Tennis Professionals (ATP) Challenger Tour was the secondary professional tennis circuit organized by the ATP. The 2013 ATP Challenger Tour calendar comprises 15 top tier Tretorn SERIE+ tournaments, and approximately 150 regular series tournaments.

WTA Tour 

The 2013 WTA Tour was the elite professional tennis circuit organized by the Women's Tennis Association (WTA) for the 2013 tennis season. The 2013 WTA Tour calendar comprises the Grand Slam tournaments (supervised by the International Tennis Federation (ITF)), the WTA Premier tournaments (Premier Mandatory, Premier 5, and regular Premier), the WTA International tournaments, the Fed Cup (organized by the ITF) and the year-end championships (the WTA Tour Championships and the WTA Tournament of Champions).

WTA Premier tournaments 
The WTA Premier tournaments were 21 of the tennis tournaments divided into three levels on the 2013 WTA Tour.

WTA International tournaments 

The WTA International Tournaments were 31 of the tennis tournaments.

Grand Slam events

Australian Open

The 2013 Australian Open was a tennis tournament played on Hardcourt (Plexicushion). It was the 101st edition of the Australian Open, and the first Grand Slam event of the year. It took place in Melbourne Park in Melbourne, Australia from January 14 to January 27, 2013.

All four of the main events in singles and same-sex doubles were won by the top seeds—Novak Djokovic in men's singles, Victoria Azarenka in women's singles, Bob and Mike Bryan in men's doubles, and Sara Errani and Roberta Vinci in women's doubles. This year's Australian Open was the first Grand Slam event since that tournament's 2004 edition in which the women's singles and doubles were won by the top seeds, and the first Grand Slam event since the 1997 Wimbledon Championships in which the men's and women's singles and doubles were all won by the top seeds.

French Open

The 2013 French Open was a tennis tournament played on outdoor clay courts. It was the 112th edition of the French Open and the second Grand Slam event of the year. It took place at the Stade Roland Garros from 26 May to 9 June. It consisted of events for professional players in singles, doubles and mixed doubles play. Junior and wheelchair players also took part in singles and doubles events.

Rafael Nadal was the three-time defending champion in the men's singles, and won the title to become the first man to win the same Grand Slam title eight times. Maria Sharapova was the defending champion in women's singles, but lost in the final to Serena Williams.

This championship was the third time in grand slam history that two multiple slam sets were accomplished in two different disciplines, and that was Serena Williams in Women's Singles, and her fellow countrymen Bob and Mike Bryan in Men's Doubles. At the 1969 US Open, Rod Laver won his multiple slam set in Men's Singles, and his fellow countryman Ken Rosewall did in Men's Doubles. At the 2012 French Open, Mahesh Bhupathi won a multiple slam set in Mixed Doubles, and Esther Vergeer won her multiple slam set in Women's Wheelchair Doubles.

Wimbledon Championships

The 2013 Wimbledon Championships was a tennis tournament played on grass courts. It was the 127th championships of the Wimbledon Championships and the third Grand Slam event of the year. It took place at the All England Lawn Tennis and Croquet Club in Wimbledon, London, United Kingdom, from 24 June to 7 July 2013.

Roger Federer and Serena Williams were the defending champions in singles events, but neither was able to repeat their success. This marked the first time since 1927 in which both defending champions were eliminated before the quarter-finals.

Andy Murray became the first man from Great Britain to win the singles title since Fred Perry in 1936. Marion Bartoli won the women's singles title. Bob and Mike Bryan completed the "Bryan Slam" and became the first team to hold all four Grand Slams and the Olympic Gold at the same time.

US Open

The 2013 US Open was a tennis tournament played on outdoor hard courts. It was the 133rd edition of the US Open and the final fourth Grand Slam event of the year. It took place at the USTA Billie Jean King National Tennis Center, and ran from August 26 to September 9.

Team events

Hopman Cup

The Hopman Cup XXV (also known as the Hyundai Hopman Cup for sponsorship purposes) was the 25th edition of the Hopman Cup tournament between nations in men's and women's tennis commenced on 29 December 2012 at the Perth Arena in Perth, Australia. Eight teams competed for the title, with two round robin groups of four, from which the top team of each group progressed to the final. Czech Republic, the defending champions, decided not to defend their title.

The 2013 Hopman Cup was won by Spain – Spain's fourth title, defeating Serbia in the final 2–1. Serbia won the men's singles, followed by Spain's winning of the women's singles; then the deciding mixed doubles event was won by Spain in straight sets.

  – Fernando Verdasco / Anabel Medina Garrigues def.  – Novak Djokovic / Ana Ivanovic.

Davis Cup
The 2013 Davis Cup (also known as the 2013 Davis Cup by BNP Paribas for sponsorship purposes) is the 102nd edition of the tournament between national teams in men's tennis.

The draw took place on 19 September 2012 in London, United Kingdom. Although, the draws for Asia/Oceania Zone Group I and Europe/Africa Zone Group II were held following the remaining play-off ties on 19–21 October 2012.

World Group Draw

Fed Cup
The 2013 Fed Cup (also known as the 2013 Fed Cup by BNP Paribas for sponsorship purposes) was the 51st edition of the most important tournament between national teams in women's tennis. The final took place on 2–3 November. The draw took place on 6 June 2012 in Paris, France.

World Group Draw

Retirements
Following is a list of notable players (winners of a main tour title, and/or part of the ATP or WTA rankings Top 100 (singles) or Top 50 (doubles) for at least one week) who announced their retirement from professional tennis, became inactive (after not playing for more than 52 weeks), or were permanently banned from playing, during the 2013 season:

  Ágnes Szávay
  Anastasija Sevastova
  Anna Chakvetadze
  Anne Keothavong
  Elena Baltacha
  Esther Vergeer
  James Blake
  Jill Craybas
  Marion Bartoli
  Rebecca Marino
  Ricardo Mello
  Séverine Beltrame
  Xavier Malisse
  David Nalbandian

International Tennis Hall of Fame
Class of 2013:
Daphne Akhurst, player
James Anderson, player
Wilfred Baddeley, player
Blanche Bingley, player
Charlotte Cooper, player
Thelma Coyne Long, player
Martina Hingis, player
Cliff Drysdale, contributor
Charlie Pasarell, contributor
Ion Țiriac, contributor

References

External links

 Official website of the Association of Tennis Professionals (ATP)
 Official website of the Women's Tennis Association (WTA)
 Official website of the International Tennis Federation (ITF)

 
Tennis by year